Rebecca Chin (born 11 December 1991) is a retired British rower who competed in international events and a former Paralympic discus and shot put thrower.

Paralympic career
Chin competed in the Paralympic discus and shot put, in the F44 classification at the   2008 Summer Paralympics but was shifted to the F38 category as it was deemed appropriate for her unusual leg function. However, after her shot put event, she was stripped of her shot put silver medal due to an on the spot reclassification of her disability, Chin was born with hyperlax ankle ligaments.

Rowing career
During her rowing career, she competed in the women's fours events mainly with Karen Bennett, Pippa Whittaker and Michelle Vezie. She was part of the British team that topped the medal table at the 2015 World Rowing Championships at Lac d'Aiguebelette in France, where she won a silver medal as part of the coxless four with Karen Bennett, Lucinda Gooderham and Holly Norton.

Chin retired due to back injury in 2018 where she was aiming to compete at the 2020 Summer Olympics.

References

1991 births
Living people
Sportspeople from St Asaph
Welsh female rowers
Welsh female discus throwers
Welsh female shot putters
Athletes (track and field) at the 2008 Summer Paralympics
Rowers at the 2012 Summer Paralympics
Competitors stripped of Paralympic medals